The UEFA Euro 2016 qualifying tournament was a football competition that was played from September 2014 to November 2015 to determine the 23 UEFA member men's national teams joining the automatically qualified host team France in the UEFA Euro 2016 final tournament.

A total of 53 national teams participated in this qualifying process, with Gibraltar taking part for the first time. The draw took place at the Palais des Congrès Acropolis, Nice, on 23 February 2014.

Qualified teams

{| class="wikitable sortable"
|-
! Team
! Qualified as
! Qualified on
! data-sort-type="number"|Previous appearances in tournament
|-
|  ||  ||  || 8 (1960, 1984, 1992, 1996, 2000, 2004, 2008, 2012)
|-
|  ||  ||  || 8 (1968, 1980, 1988, 1992, 1996, 2000, 2004, 2012)
|-
|  ||  ||  || 8 (1960, 1976, 1980, 1996, 2000, 2004, 2008, 2012)
|-
|  ||  ||  || 0 (debut)
|-
|  ||  ||  || 1 (2008)
|-
|  ||  ||  || 0 (debut)
|-
|  ||  ||  || 6 (1984, 1996, 2000, 2004, 2008, 2012)
|-
|  ||  ||  || 9 (1964, 1980, 1984, 1988, 1996, 2000, 2004, 2008, 2012)
|-
|  ||  ||  || 3 (1996, 2004, 2008)
|-
|  ||  ||  || 8 (1968, 1980, 1988, 1996, 2000, 2004, 2008, 2012)
|-
|  ||  ||  || 4 (1972, 1980, 1984, 2000)
|-
|  ||  ||  || 0 (debut)
|-
|  ||  ||  || 4 (1984, 1996, 2000, 2008)
|-
|  ||  ||  || 0 (debut)
|-
|  ||  ||  || 11 (1972, 1976, 1980, 1984, 1988, 1992, 1996, 2000, 2004, 2008, 2012)
|-
|  ||  ||  || 2 (2008, 2012)
|-
|  ||  ||  || 10 (1960, 1964, 1968, 1972, 1988, 1992, 1996, 2004, 2008, 2012)
|-
|   ||  ||  || 3 (1960, 1976, 1980)
|-
|  ||  ||  || 4 (1996, 2004, 2008, 2012)
|-
|  ||  ||  || 3 (1996, 2000, 2008)
|-
|  ||  ||  || 2 (1964, 1972)
|-
|  ||  ||  || 2 (1988, 2012)
|-
|  ||  ||  || 5 (1992, 2000, 2004, 2008, 2012)
|-
|  ||  ||  || 1 (2012)
|}

Format
All UEFA member associations were eligible to compete in the qualifying competition, with the host team France qualifying directly to the finals tournament. The other 53 teams were drawn into eight groups of six teams (Groups A–H) and one group of five teams (Group I). The group winners, runners-up, and the best third-placed team (with the results against the sixth-placed team discarded) directly qualified to the finals. The eight remaining third-placed teams contested two-legged play-offs to determine the last four qualifiers for the finals.

Seeding system
Sides were seeded according to the UEFA national team coefficient rankings, which were announced along with the draw procedure and final tournament match schedule after the 23–24 January Executive Committee meeting in Nyon. For the qualifying group stage, the teams were seeded into six pots (Pots 1–5 with 9 teams and Pot 6 with 8 teams) for the qualifying group stage draw according to the UEFA national team coefficient rankings, with the title holders (Spain) automatically seeded into Pot 1. Each nation's coefficient was generated by calculating:

 40% of the average ranking points per game earned in the 2014 FIFA World Cup qualifying stage.
 40% of the average ranking points per game earned in the UEFA Euro 2012 qualifying stage and final tournament.
 20% of the average ranking points per game earned in the 2010 FIFA World Cup qualifying stage and final tournament.

UEFA stated that nations with the largest markets in terms of contribution to the European Qualifiers revenue would be drawn into one of the groups containing six teams. They included England, Spain, Germany, Italy and the Netherlands. UEFA also stated in their regulations that "the teams drawn into the group of five teams will have France added to their group for the purpose of playing centralised friendlies".

For the play-offs the four ties were determined by draw, including the order of the two legs of each tie. The teams were seeded for the play-off draw according to the UEFA national team coefficient rankings updated after the completion of the group stage. Each nation's coefficient was generated by calculating:

 40% of the average ranking points per game earned in the UEFA Euro 2016 qualifying group stage.
 40% of the average ranking points per game earned in the 2014 FIFA World Cup qualifying stage and final tournament.
 20% of the average ranking points per game earned in the UEFA Euro 2012 qualifying stage and final tournament.

Tiebreakers
If two or more teams were equal on points on completion of the group matches, the following tie-breaking criteria were applied:

 Higher number of points obtained in the matches played among the teams in question;
 Superior goal difference in matches played among the teams in question;
 Higher number of goals scored in the matches played among the teams in question;
 Higher number of goals scored away from home in the matches played among the teams in question;
 If, after having applied criteria 1 to 4, teams still had an equal ranking, criteria 1 to 4 were reapplied exclusively to the matches between the teams in question to determine their final rankings. If this procedure did not lead to a decision, criteria 6 to 10 applied;
 Superior goal difference in all group matches;
 Higher number of goals scored in all group matches;
 Higher number of away goals scored in all group matches;
 Fair play conduct in all group matches (1 point for a single yellow card, 3 points for a red card as a consequence of two yellow cards, 3 points for a direct red card, 4 points for a yellow card followed by a direct red card);
 Position in the UEFA national team coefficient ranking system;

To determine the best third-placed team, the results against the teams in sixth place were discarded. The following criteria were applied:

 Higher number of points obtained;
 Superior goal difference;
 Higher number of goals scored;
 Higher number of away goals scored;
 Fair play conduct in all group matches;
 Position in the UEFA national team coefficient ranking system;

For each play-off tie, the team that scored more goals on aggregate over the two legs qualified for the final tournament. If the aggregate score was level, the away goals rule was applied, i.e., the team that scored more goals away from home over the two legs advanced. If away goals were also equal, then thirty minutes of extra time was played, divided into two fifteen-minutes halves. The away goals rule was again applied after extra time, i.e., if there were goals scored during extra time and the aggregate score was still level, the visiting team advanced by virtue of more away goals scored. If no goals were scored during extra time, the tie was decided by penalty shoot-out.

 Notes

Schedule

This was the first qualifying tournament after UEFA announced centralised rights deals for both UEFA Euro and FIFA World Cup qualifying. UEFA had proposed the "Week of Football" concept for the scheduling of qualifying matches:

 Matches took place from Thursday to Tuesday.
 Kick-off times were largely set at 18:00 and 20:45 CET on Saturdays and Sundays, and 20:45 CET on Thursdays, Fridays, Mondays and Tuesdays.
 On double-header matchweeks, teams played on Thursday and Sunday, or Friday and Monday, or Saturday and Tuesday.
 Matches in the same group were played on the same day.

There were ten matchdays for the qualifying group stage, and two matchdays for the play-offs:

Unlike previous qualifying campaigns where group fixtures were determined by negotiation between the national federations, UEFA themselves decided each group's fixture list, released the same day as the draw.

Draw
The draw took place at the Palais des Congrès Acropolis, Nice, on 23 February 2014, 12:00 CET. Groups A–H each contain one team from each of Pots 1–6, while Group I contains one team from each of Pots 1–5. For television rights reasons, England, Germany, Italy, Spain and the Netherlands were drawn into groups of six teams. Before the draw UEFA confirmed that, for political reasons, Armenia would not be drawn against Azerbaijan (due to the dispute concerning territory of Nagorno-Karabakh) and Gibraltar would not be drawn against Spain (due to the disputed status of Gibraltar). France (Coeff: 30,992; Rank: 11) were partnered with the five-team Group I, which enabled the 2016 tournament hosts to play friendlies against these countries on their 'spare' dates. These friendlies did not count in the qualifying group standings.

Seeding
The seeding pots were announced on 24 January 2014. 

Teams in bold eventually qualified for the final tournament, teams in bold italic qualified for the final tournament through the play-offs, and teams in italic participated in the play-offs but did not qualify for the final tournament.

Summary

Groups

Group A

Group B

Group C

Group D

Group E

Group F

Group G

Group H

Group I

Ranking of third-placed teams
The highest ranked third-placed team from the groups directly qualified for the tournament, while the remainder entered the play-offs. As Group I contained five teams and the rest contained six, matches against any sixth-placed team in each group were not included in this ranking. As a result, a total of eight matches played by each team count toward the purpose of the third-placed ranking table.

Turkey became the best third-placed team, after winning against Iceland in its last match, while at the same time Kazakhstan beat Latvia to finish fifth in Group A.

Play-offs

The eight remaining third-placed teams contested two-legged play-offs to determine the last four qualifiers for the finals. The teams were seeded for the play-off draw according to the UEFA national team coefficient rankings updated after the completion of the qualifying group stage. The draw for the play-offs was held on 18 October 2015, 11:20 CEST, at the UEFA headquarters in Nyon.

Seedings

Matches
The first legs were played on 12–14 November, and the second legs were played on 15–17 November 2015. The four play-off winners (Ukraine, Sweden, Republic of Ireland and Hungary) qualified for the final tournament.

Goalscorers

Branding
UEFA unveiled the branding for the qualifiers on 15 April 2013. It shows a national jersey inside a heart, and represents Europe, honour and ambition. The same branding was also used for the European qualifiers for the 2018 World Cup.

Broadcasting

Notes

References

External links

 UEFA Euro 2016 at UEFA.com

 
Euro Qualifying
Euro Qualifying
2016
Qualifying